is a train station on the Osaka Metro Imazatosuji Line in Asahi-ku, Osaka, Japan.

Lines
Osaka Metro Imazatosuji Line (Station Number: I16)

Layout
The station has one island platform serving two tracks; automatic platform gates are present on the platform.

References

Asahi-ku, Osaka
Jōtō-ku, Osaka
Osaka Metro stations
Railway stations in Osaka
Railway stations in Japan opened in 2006